Renáta Jamrichová (born 20 June 2007) is a Slovak tennis player.

She has a career high WTA singles ranking of 629 achieved on 28 November 2022. She also has a career high WTA doubles ranking of 1132 achieved on 19 December 2022.

In 2022, she won 2 gold medals at the EYOF, winning in singles and mixed doubles. Jamrichová and her partner Federica Urgesi won the 2023 Australian girls' doubles title beating Hayu Kinoshita and Sara Saito in the final.

Junior Grand Slam finals

Girls' doubles

References

External links
 
 

2007 births
Living people
Slovak female tennis players
Grand Slam (tennis) champions in girls' doubles
Australian Open (tennis) junior champions